The 1999 Division 1 season was the 34th of the competition of the first-tier football in Senegal.  The tournament was organized by the Senegalese Football Federation.  The season began on January 10 and finished on 19 September 1999.  ASC Jeanne d'Arc won the seventh title and participated in the 2000 CAF Champions League the following year.  ASEC Ndiambour participated in the 2000 CAF Cup of Cups and Compagnie sucrière sénégalaise in the 2000 CAF Winners' Cup.

Four clubs would relegate into Division 2 the following season and the number of clubs in Division 1 was reduced to twelve.

ASEC Ndiambour was the defending team of the title.  A total of 14 clubs participated in the competition.  The season featured 183matches and scored 305 goals.

Participating clubs

 US Gorée
 Compagnie sucrière sénégalaise (Senegalese Sugar Company)
 ASC Port Autonome
 AS Douanes
 ASC Jeanne d'Arc
 ASC Yeggo
 AS Police

 ASC Niayès-Pikine
 Dakar Université Club
 Stade de Mbour
 US Rail
 ASFA Dakar
 SONACOS
 ASEC Ndiambour

Overview
The league was contested by 14 teams with ASC Jeanne d'Arc winning the championship.

League standings

Footnotes

External links
Historic results at rsssf.com

Senegal
Senegal Premier League seasons